Sharp Place is an unincorporated community in Fentress County, in the U.S. state of Tennessee.

History
The community was likely named for one or more members of the Sharp family, who were known to be residing in the area in the mid-19th century.

References

Unincorporated communities in Fentress County, Tennessee
Unincorporated communities in Tennessee